The blacktip tope (Hypogaleus hyugaensis), also known as pencil shark or blacktip topeshark, is a houndshark of the family Triakidae, and the only member of the genus Hypogaleus. It is found in the deep waters of the continental shelf in the Indo-West Pacific, from East Africa to Japan, at depths between 40 and 230 m. It can grow up to a length of 1.27 m.

References 

 

blacktip tope
Marine fauna of East Africa
Fish of the Persian Gulf
Fish of Japan
Fish of Taiwan
Marine fish of Southern Australia
blacktip tope